The Mount Erlang Tunnel is a road tunnel along Sichuan-Tibet Highway (China National Highway 318), which connects China's Sichuan Province and Tibet Autonomous Region. The tunnel is 8,596 meters long and was dug through Mount Erlang in Sichuan Province.

It opened on December 8, 1999. Construction took three years and cost 470 million yuan (56.6 million US dollars). 

It was built to reduce time and replaces one of the most dangerous parts of the highway, which had frequent accidents because of landslides, rain and foggy weather.

New Tunnel
Erlangshan extra-long tunnel under the same mountain was completed in 2018. It is a part of the Yakang Expressway and has a total length of 13 433 metres, making it the 11th longest road tunnel in the world as of 2021. The tunnel passes through several seismic fault zones and its deeperts parts are 1 500 metres underground. At its western end, the tunnel links up with the Xingkang Bridge.

References

See also
China National Highway 318
List of longest road tunnels

Transport in Sichuan
Road tunnels in China
Buildings and structures in Sichuan
Tunnels completed in 2001